Frank Otto may refer to:

Frank Otto (academic) (1936–2017), American educator
Frank Otto (media entrepreneur) (born 1957), German media entrepreneur
Frank Otto (water polo) (born 1959), German water polo player

See also
Otto Frank (physiologist) (1865–1944), German academic and cardiac researcher
Otto Frank (1889–1980), German businessman; father of Anne Frank
Otto Franke (disambiguation)